This is a list of the 558 MPs or Members of Parliament elected to the 314 constituencies of the Parliament of Great Britain in 1754, the 11th Parliament of Great Britain.

The candidates returned in contested elections are listed in the descending order of the number of votes received.

The Tory versus Whig party division, which had originated in the Exclusion Bill debates in the seventeenth century, was almost extinct by 1754. Whilst some members were still identifiable as being of a Tory or Whig persuasion, few contested elections turned on party cries. The hotly contested Oxfordshire and Reading elections were amongst the few where party in the old sense mattered at all and 1754 was the last such election in those areas. Identification by party in the list below is therefore of limited significance, particularly as to the future loyalties of the politician concerned.

For what it is worth the government electoral manager, Viscount Dupplin, reported to the Whig Prime Minister (Thomas Pelham-Holles, 1st Duke of Newcastle) that the outcome of the election was Administration 368, Tory 106, Opposition Whig 42 and doubtful 26.

Peers of Ireland are differentiated from the holders of courtesy titles by including the succession number to the peerage, i.e. The 1st Earl of Upper Ossory is an Irish peer and Viscount Dupplin is the holder of a courtesy title.



By-elections 
List of Great Britain by-elections (1754–74)

Notes 
(a) There was a double return for both seats at Oxfordshire. The House of Commons decided on 23 April 1755 that Viscount Parker and Sir Edward Turner were duly elected and rejected the claims of the 6th Viscount Wenman and Sir James Dashwood.
(b) There was a double return for both seats at Wareham. The House of Commons decided, on 30 December 1754, that Henry Drax and William Augustus Pitt were duly elected and rejected the claims of Thomas Erle Drax and John Pitt.
(c) There was a double return for the second seat at Bury St Edmunds as Augustus John Hervey and Felton Hervey were tied (with 15 votes each). The House of Commons declared the election for this seat void on 2 December 1754. Felton Hervey (Administration) was returned unopposed at a by-election on 9 December 1754.
(d) There was a triple return for the two seats at Salisbury. The House of Commons decided, on 26 November 1754, that William Bouverie and Julines Beckford were duly elected and rejected the claim of Edward Poore.

See also 
1754 British general election
List of parliaments of Great Britain
Unreformed House of Commons

References 

 The House of Commons 1754–1790, by Sir Lewis Namier and John Brooke (HMSO 1964)

External links 
 History of Parliament: Members 1754–1790
 History of Parliament: Constituencies 1754–1790

1754
1754
1754 in Great Britain
Lists of Members of the Parliament of Great Britain